White Rainbow (also known as  Shwet) is a 2005 Indian Hindi and English-language film directed by Dharan Mandrayar and starring Sonali Kulkarni, Amardeep Jha, Shameem Shaikh, and Amruta Subhash.
The film is about the widows of Vrindavan: women who lost their husbands and wear white waiting to return with them in the afterlife. Several of these women are forced out of their house since they rejected a second marriage. The film follows four different widows.

Cast
Sonali Kulkarni as Priya
Amardeep Jha as Roop
Shameem Shaikh as Mala
Amruta Subhash as Deepthi
Gaurav Kapoor as Gaurav Kapoor
Virendra Saxena as Pramod Panda
Amitabh Srivastava as Lal

Production 
The film was named White Rainbow because Mandrayar felt that the widows still have lot of life in them. The film began production after Water'''s (a film also about the Vrindavan widows) shooting was halted in 1999. Mandrayar was inspired to make this film after he read about a 13-year-old widow who was forced to go to Vrindavan.

Reception
A critic from The Hindu wrote that "Making a film on the plight of widows in a part of our country calls for strong conviction. Creator Dharan Mandrayar and Prabhu Movies have it in plenty. Otherwise they couldn't have taken up the subject and laid bare the stigma, subjugation and disgrace the husbandless face in a so-called pious milieu". Dennis Harvey of Variety opined that "But writer-helmer Dharan Mandrayar lets episodic pic flatline between excessively melodramatic peaks; fans of florid bad acting will find the ham cut thick here. Tech aspects are decent". A critic from Bollywood Hungama'' opined that "On the whole, SHWET - WHITE RAINBOW is a poor fare. At the box-office, it's a loser all the way".

Accolades
The film won Best Feature Film in Sedona, Arizona.

References

Notes

External links
Other reviews

2005 films
2005 drama films
2000s Hindi-language films
English-language Indian films
Films about women in India
Films about widowhood in India
Films set in India